Gostiražni is a village in the municipality of Dolneni, North Macedonia.

Demographics
Gostiražni appears in 15th century Ottoman defters as a village in the nahiyah of Köprülü. Among its inhabitants, instances of  household heads bearing Albanian anthroponyms, alongside the attribute Arnaut, a medieval Ottoman rendering for Albanians, are also present, such as: Gon Arnaud.

In statistics gathered by Vasil Kanchov in 1900, the village of Gostiražni was inhabited by 272 Bulgarian Exarchists.

According to the 2021 census, the village had a total of 135 inhabitants. Ethnic groups in the village include:

Albanians 97 
Macedonians 31
Serbs 1
Others 6

References

External links

Villages in Dolneni Municipality
Albanian communities in North Macedonia